Diamond Dove (2006) is a crime novel by Australian author Adrian Hyland. It is the first in the author's series of novels featuring the recurring character Emily Tempest. It won the Best First Novel category of the 2007 Ned Kelly Awards.

Plot summary

Emily Tempest, the daughter of a white miner and his black wife, returns to her childhood home, Moonlight Downs in the Northern Territory, after completing her schooling at an Adelaide boarding school.  Her homecoming is impacted by the murder of Lincoln, the local elder.  The police are baffled but Tempest makes use of her unique background to track down the killer.

Notes

 Dedication: For Kristin

Reviews

Mindy Laube in the Sydney Morning Herald noted that the novel is "popular literature of the stylish and substantial variety".

Awards and nominations

 2006 commended The Fellowship of Australian Writers Victoria Inc. National Literary Awards — FAW Christina Stead Award  
 2007 winner Ned Kelly Awards for Crime Writing — Best First Novel

References

2006 novels
Australian crime novels
Ned Kelly Award-winning works